St. Brigid Island is the ice-covered island 2.7 km long in southwest–northeast direction and 1.4 km wide, largest in the Barcroft group of Biscoe Islands. Its surface area is 222 ha.

It is named after St. Brigid of Kildare (c. 451–525), the patron saint of scholars.

Location

Maps
 British Antarctic Territory. Scale 1:200000 topographic map. DOS 610 Series, Sheet W 66 66. Directorate of Overseas Surveys, UK, 1976
 Antarctic Digital Database (ADD). Scale 1:250000 topographic map of Antarctica. Scientific Committee on Antarctic Research (SCAR). Since 1993, regularly upgraded and updated

See also
 List of Antarctic and subantarctic islands

Notes

References
 St. Brigid Island. SCAR Composite Gazetteer of Antarctica
 Bulgarian Antarctic Gazetteer. Antarctic Place-names Commission. (details in Bulgarian, basic data in English)

External links
 St. Brigid Island. Adjusted Copernix satellite image

Islands of the Biscoe Islands
Bulgaria and the Antarctic